Roberto Luiz Souza (born September 7, 1951) is a Brazilian former Olympic sailor in the Soling and Star classes. He competed in Soling in the 1980 Summer Olympics together with Gastão Brun and Vicente Brun, where they finished 6th, and in Star in the 1984 Summer Olympics together with Eduardo de Souza, where they finished 12th.

References

Living people
1951 births
Olympic sailors of Brazil
Brazilian male sailors (sport)
Sailors at the 1980 Summer Olympics – Soling
Sailors at the 1984 Summer Olympics – Star
Place of birth missing (living people)